The Ladykillers or Ladykillers may refer to:

 The Ladykillers (1955 film), a 1955 comedy film starring Alec Guinness
 The Ladykillers (2004 film), a remake featuring Tom Hanks
 The Ladykillers (play), a 2011 stage adaptation of the 1955 film
 Ladykillers (film), an unrelated 1988 made-for-TV movie
 National Lampoon's Lady Killers, a 2003 comedy film
 "Ladykillers" (song), a song from the album Lovelife by Lush
 Ladykillers, a 1980–81 Granada Television television series on famous historical murder cases involving women

See also
 Lady Killer (disambiguation)